The Fourth International can refer to:

The Fourth International - World Party of Socialist Revolution, founded by Trotskyists in 1938, which organisationally continues as the Fourth International (post-reunification)
Various groups which claim the political heritage of the Fourth International:
The Fourth International (ICR)
The Fourth International Posadist
The International Committee of the Fourth International
The Communist Workers' International of left communists, founded in 1923.

See also
List of Trotskyist internationals